Food consumption is the amount of food available for human consumption as estimated by Our World in Data. However, the actual food consumption.             may be lower than the quantity shown as food availability depends on the magnitude of wastage and losses of food in the household, for example during storage, in preparation and cooking, as plate-waste or quantities fed to domestic animals and pets, thrown or given away.

Although this data is presented in kilocalorie format, most countries today use the SI unit kilojoules as their primary measurement for food energy intake, with the exception of the USA, Canada, and the UK, which require both.

Historical development

Regions of the world by food consumption per capita in kilocalories per capita per day from 1961 to 2018.

See also
Food power
Food politics

References

Diets
Food energy intake
Food energy intake
Malnutrition